This page documents notable tornadoes and tornado outbreaks worldwide in 1973, but mostly features events in the United States. According to tornado researcher Thomas P. Grazulis, documentation of tornadoes outside the United States was historically less exhaustive, owing to the lack of monitors in many nations and, in some cases, to internal political controls on public information. Most countries only recorded tornadoes that produced severe damage or loss of life. Consequently, available documentation in 1973 mainly covered the United States. On average, most recorded tornadoes, including the vast majority of significant—F2 or stronger—tornadoes, form in the U.S., although as many as 500 may take place internationally. Some locations, like Bangladesh, are as prone to violent tornadoes as the U.S., meaning F4 or greater events on the Fujita scale.

Historically, the number of tornadoes globally and in the United States was and is likely underrepresented: research by Grazulis on annual tornado activity suggests that, as of 2001, only 53% of yearly U.S. tornadoes were officially recorded. Significant low biases in U.S. tornado counts likely occurred through the early 1990s, when advanced NEXRAD was first installed and the National Weather Service began comprehensively verifying tornado occurrences. Owing to increases in storm spotters, the number of tornadoes in the U.S. reached new heights in the early 1970s. 1973 was the first year in which more than 1,000 tornadoes were verified in the United States. The long-term annual mean for the U.S. is roughly 1,300 tornadoes each year, though Grazulis estimates that the real total may be close to 1,800. Despite having the highest annual total in the nation to date, 1973 failed to establish records in terms of significant or killer tornadoes—several earlier years had already done so.

Notable scientific milestones toward understanding the life cycle of tornadoes occurred in Oklahoma on May 24, 1973, when researchers exploited primitive Doppler weather radar, then under development by the National Severe Storms Laboratory (NSSL), to examine a tornado vortex signature, or TVS, for the first time in history. The scientists, in one of the earliest successful cases of storm chasing, were able to study the evolution of a violent tornado near Union City, and to generate clear visual photography of its entire life cycle, from birth to decay. The successful deployment of Doppler radar to detect tornado formation also pointed the way to the development of a nationwide Doppler radar system, and helped precipitate funding for studies on tornadogenesis.

Synopsis

At the beginning of the year, one of the strongest El Niño episodes since 1950, as defined by sea surface temperatures, was in progress but gradually diminishing, according to the Oceanic Niño Index (ONI). Peak trimonthly anomalies, measured in moving averages, were +1.7 °C above normal for the period December–February 1972 – 1973. The month of January featured clusters of tornado activity along the Gulf Coast, primarily in Texas and Louisiana, as well as part of the Florida peninsula—a pattern not inconsistent with that of El Niño winters in general. The deadliest and strongest tornado of the month was an F3 that struck Caldwell Parish, Louisiana, on January 18, killing one person and injuring two others. It was part of a larger outbreak on the same date that spawned five other significant tornadoes near the Gulf Coast, with 20 total injuries. A smaller outbreak affected Central Florida ten days later, causing damaging F2 tornadoes in the Campbell–Orlando area, with 24 injuries. February featured much less activity, with 10 confirmed tornadoes compared to 33 in January, and no destructive or deadly tornadoes occurred. Outside the U.S., a catastrophic tornado, believed to be an F5, ravaged a small town in Argentina on January 10, causing more than 50 deaths.

Intense tornado activity increased significantly across the U.S. in March, when the nation's first violent tornadoes of the year touched down in Texas and South Carolina. There were 17 deaths and 300 injuries by the end of the month, largely due to two major tornado outbreaks, and tornadoes occurred as far north as Kansas and Michigan. On March 10, an overnight outbreak concentrated in Texas produced a killer F4 tornado that devastated the small town of Hubbard, killing six people and injuring 77. On March 31, another outbreak spawned a long-lived supercell that tracked through northern Georgia, causing what was officially that state's costliest natural disaster at the time, with prolific losses from a tornado centered in and near Conyers–Athens; damages reportedly reached $113 million in 1973 dollars. Despite the damage, the tornado was of only F2 intensity, and just two deaths were attributed to the tornado, with about 100 injuries. On the same date, a separate tornado in western South Carolina attained F4 strength, killing seven people and injuring 30. In all, 80 tornadoes struck the U.S. in the month of March, 39 of which were F2 or greater.

The month of April was even more active, with 150 tornadoes and 73 F2+ events. The highest concentration of significant tornadoes was in Missouri, where 17 F2+ events occurred. The deadliest tornado of the month was a massive F4 on April 15 that produced intense damage to vehicles and an airport near Pearsall, Texas, killing five people and injuring 12. All of the dead were riding in vehicles, one of which contained eight occupants, mostly Mexicans. The tornado struck two cars traveling on Interstate 35 and lofted them into fields, where they were mangled so badly as to be unidentifiable as vehicles. On the same day, an F3 tornado near Plainview affected Interstate 27 and killed two people, one of whom was yet again inside a car: a monitor working for REACT was positioning himself when the tornado hurled his vehicle hundreds of yards. The latter part of April was extremely active, with a major tornado outbreak sequence on April 19–21 and smaller outbreaks on several other days. The period April 17–28 featured tornadoes on 11 consecutive days. The state of Missouri was hardest hit, with three F4 tornadoes each on April 19–21. There were two deaths during this period, one each in Missouri and Arkansas.

The following month, May, was the deadliest month of the year in the U.S., with 35 fatalities from tornadoes—22 of which took place in a three-day span on May 26–29. The nation's only F5 tornado of the year struck near Valley Mills, Texas, on May 6, where it swept away a few barns, leaving little debris on the foundations. Engineers assigned an F5 rating to the tornado because it lofted a pickup truck for a considerable distance. An outbreak over Ohio on May 10 included an F3 tornado that flattened mobile homes in three trailer courts near Willard, inflicting six deaths and 100 injuries. Deadly F4 tornadoes killed a combined seven people in Oklahoma on May 24 and 26, respectively, with significant impacts to the community of Keefton. An outbreak sequence produced continuous tornado activity from May 26–29, with no gap between tornadoes exceeding six hours. A destructive nighttime tornado, or series of tornadoes, ravaged Jonesboro, Arkansas, on May 26, injuring nearly 300 people, but surprisingly with only three deaths. The next day, a long-tracked, violent tornado crossed almost  of central Alabama, obliterating most of the town of Brent, injuring about 200 people, and killing seven.

The remainder of the year featured a rare F4 tornado in New England that struck along the New York/Massachusetts state border on August 28, killing four people and injuring 36, with F4 damage to a home in West Stockbridge, Massachusetts. An outbreak sequence consisting of several tornado families hit mainly Kansas and Nebraska on September 24–26, with three deaths and almost 60 injuries. At the end of the year, on December 20, Dade County, Florida, experienced one of its most damaging tornadoes to date when an F2 tornado passed through farmland near Homestead, with $800,000 in contemporary losses. In the United States, 1973 was the most active tornado year up to that time, with over 1,100 confirmed tornadoes. Tornadoes killed 89 people nationwide, which exceeded the annual average of about 60, and there were almost 2,400 injuries. Greg Carbin of the Storm Prediction Center (SPC), upon examining data maintained, concluded that strong El Niño events—as measured by the multivariate ENSO index—may foster better conditions for more tornadoes.

Events

United States yearly total

January

33 tornadoes were confirmed in January in the United States.

January 10 (Argentina)

A large and violent but short-lived tornado caused at least 63 direct deaths and 350 injuries as it devastated the town of San Justo in Santa Fe Province, Argentina. The tornado affected 500 homes in its path, many of which were leveled or severely damaged, along with a hotel and a car dealership. A press report indicated that numerous homes were swept clean from their concrete foundations. Reportedly, the tornado hurled dozens of vehicles like "ping-pong balls," including an occupied car that flew  through the air, with four fatalities from victims who fell to the ground. Several vehicles were thrown for at least  and mangled beyond recognition. Additionally, a  tractor was found in a wooded area  from its origin, and immense trees were torn from the ground and thrown. Furthermore, grass was reportedly ripped from the ground and a pond outside of town was sucked dry. The tornado, which was officially rated F5 in 2017, was the most violent ever reported in Argentina and Southern Hemisphere, and caused great economic loss. The economic cost of this disaster was about $60,000.

January 18

An outbreak of 10 tornadoes largely affected the Mississippi Valley on January 18, though scattered activity occurred as far west as the town of Seminole in Oklahoma, where an F2 tornado damaged several structures, vehicles, and electrical wires, injuring four people mildly, as well as toppling trees. The parent supercell later continued into Richland Parish, with a path length totaling . Another tornado, an F2, struck Tallulah, wrecking a self-service laundry and causing roof damage to five homes, resulting in four minor injuries. The largest number of injuries in a single tornado on January 18 occurred in Mississippi, where an F2 near Stallo flipped trailers and a business, both of which shattered, injuring eight people. Two of the injured were hurled from the structure in which they were standing. In all, the entire outbreak spawned tornadoes as far north as southern Illinois, injured 20 people, and killed one.

January 20–22

A localized outbreak of mostly weak tornadoes affected parts of Central and Northeast Texas on January 20–21. Around mid-afternoon on January 20, an F2 tornado developed near Bullard in Smith County, injuring one person and damaging crops. Early on January 21, shortly after midnight CST, another F2 tornado struck the community of James in Shelby County, badly damaging several homes, with three injuries. On January 21–22, the storm system that produced the outbreak headed east, generating additional tornadoes over the Florida Panhandle and Central Florida. On January 21, an F0 tornado near Pensacola caused slight damage to an awning on a mobile home. The next day, an F1 tornado that struck Lithia wrecked several trailers, causing eight injuries. In all, the entire outbreak produced 17 tornadoes and 12 injuries.

January 28

Central Florida experienced a small but significant tornado outbreak on January 28. The most destructive of the four tornadoes on this day struck the Kissimmee and Orlando areas. An F2 tornado affected Campbell and the Idora Park section of Kissimmee, causing significant damage to about 300 homes, with seven injuries. Another F2 tornado struck the southwestern side of Orlando, where it removed the roof and wrecked several units of a multi-story apartment complex. The tornado damaged almost 230 homes and businesses, along with numerous vehicles, leaving hundreds of residents homeless and 16 (possibly 25) injured. An F1 tornado damaged mobile homes near Dade City, injuring one person, and an F2 tornado snapped an airway beacon at the Titusville–Cocoa Airport, where it also damaged an airport terminal. The entire outbreak injured 24 people.

February

10 tornadoes were reported in February in the United States.

March

80 tornadoes were reported in March in the United States.

March 9–11

A relatively small but deadly tornado outbreak mainly affected Texas during the overnight period of March 9–10, though other tornadoes from the same storm system struck Mississippi, Arkansas, and Wisconsin on March 10–11. Shortly before daybreak on March 10, the deadliest tornado of the outbreak, a violent F4, caused six deaths and 77 injuries in and near Hubbard, Texas, with severe destruction in the town itself, which lost about half of its business district and one-third of the remainder of town. Also in Texas, an F2 tornado killed one person and injured seven near Grape Creek, where it wrecked mobile homes. Another tornado in Texas, an F3, affected about 200 homes and businesses, many of which were razed, in the town of Burnet, with 40 injuries. Altogether, the tornadoes from the entire severe weather event killed seven people and injured 132.

March 13–15

A minor tornado outbreak produced several significant tornadoes across Oklahoma, Kansas, Texas, and Missouri. An F2 tornado that formed near Geronimo, Oklahoma, was responsible for most of the injuries on this day as it damaged mobile homes and roofs, injuring five people. Another F2 tornado developed near Ponca City and lifted near Atlanta, Kansas, causing severe damage to many barns and homes. Downbursts accompanied the tornado, and the combined effects caused $1 million in losses. Yet a third F2 tornado touched down near Branson in Missouri and leveled several trailers adjourning Table Rock Lake, with four injuries. It also submerged many boats near the shoreline. The large-scale weather system that spawned the outbreak headed east, producing a brief but damaging F2 tornado on March 15 near Taft, Tennessee, that damaged trees, a manufacturer, and several homes, with three injuries. One person died at the manufacturer as its roof was lifted off, crushing a security guard. During the severe weather event, 17 tornadoes touched down, one person died, and 14 people were injured.

March 16–17

A progressive outbreak sequence affected the Southeastern U.S. on March 16–17. On March 16, activity occurred in Alabama and Georgia. An F2 tornado affected Helena in Alabama, with extensive damage to several mobile homes and a commercial center. Five injuries, none of which was life-threatening, occurred. In Georgia, another F2 tornado hit the Resaca area, where severe damage was reported to structures and a vehicle was overturned. Five people were injured there as well. On March 17, five tornadoes struck Central Florida, including two F2 events, with one injury. The entire outbreak sequence caused 12 injuries but no fatalities.

March 23–24

A minor tornado outbreak commenced on March 23, with additional tornadoes the following day. It affected Texas, Louisiana, and Oklahoma, but did not produce any deaths or injuries.

March 31

A small but significant tornado outbreak on March 31 produced its most severe damage in Georgia and South Carolina, though other tornadoes struck Missouri and Illinois. An extremely destructive, long-tracked tornado caused the costliest natural disaster in Georgia history up to that time, though officially it only produced F2 damage. A survey by Ted Fujita concluded that the tornado produced F4 damage and was two distinct events in a family, not a single tornado. At least two people died and 100 were injured in Georgia, mainly near Conyers and Athens, though Grazulis mentioned a third death that is not officially documented. An F4 tornado killed seven people, mostly in a motel, in the Calhoun Falls–Abbeville area of South Carolina, where it affected well over 100 homes and injured 30 people. At the time, Fujita assigned an F5 rating to the tornado in South Carolina, but it was later downgraded to F4.

April
150 tornadoes were reported in April in the United States.

April 17
Two F3 tornadoes touched down in the Lake Charles area, injuring one person.

April 17 (Bangladesh)
One of the deadliest tornadoes to strike Bangladesh leveled large swaths of Balur Char and other locations in the Manikganj District. At least 681 fatalities occurred, though unverifiable estimates exceeded 1,000. Reportedly, observers witnessed twin funnels that combined to form a single, large tornado. At least eight villages were nearly obliterated as the tornado tracked near the Kaliganga River. In Balur Char, the tornado destroyed all homes. One permanent dwelling, or pucca, was displaced some meters from its foundation, even though the structure was built of concrete. Numerous trees were downed as well, intermingled with bodies of the dead. The tornado is believed to have been "violent" (at least F4 in intensity).

April 19–21

An expansive, major tornado outbreak sequence spawned 68 tornadoes, including 38 significant events, on April 19–21. Tornadoes affected the states of Arkansas, Tennessee, Kansas, Missouri, Kentucky, South Dakota, Iowa, Illinois, North Dakota, and Oklahoma. On April 19, an F3 tornado struck Batesville in Arkansas, where structures were dislodged from their foundations or sustained collapse of their walls. 18 injuries occurred in town. Early on April 20, another F3 tornado struck the Ada area in Oklahoma, damaging about 500 structures and several aircraft. Numerous homes and a trailer park were razed, leaving 21 people injured. Later that morning, yet another F3 tornado hit near Harrison, Arkansas, where one fatality occurred and many homes disintegrated, with 19 injuries. An F2 tornado flattened barns and trailers near Sedalia, Missouri, dispersing debris for a few miles and injuring eight (possibly 13) people. The strongest tornado of the day attained F4 intensity near La Plata, where one home disintegrated and was swept from its foundation, causing one death. Three injuries occurred as well. Two other F4 tornadoes struck Missouri on April 19 and 21, respectively. On the latter date, an F2 tornado in the Parnell–Holbrook area in Iowa struck 25 farms in its path, tearing off roofs, leveling several barns, and causing one home to slide and buckle. The tornado injured six (possibly only one) people. In all, the entire outbreak sequence killed two people and injured 106.

April 23–25

A small outbreak of tornadoes mainly impacted Texas and Arkansas on April 23–24, with additional tornadoes farther east on April 25. On April 23, a brief tornado traveled  through Cleburne, Texas, producing F3-level damage as roofs were removed. Three people were injured in Cleburne. Just before dawn on April 24, another F2 tornado caused extensive damage to parts of Texarkana, injuring eight people and producing losses of nearly $2 million in 1973 U.S. dollars. Later that morning, a third F2 tornado struck a school in Sumner, Mississippi, leveling temporary structures and injuring 42 people. Minor tornadoes struck Tennessee, Florida, and Georgia on April 25. The entire severe weather event injured 59 people.

April 26–27

Another small outbreak on April 26–27 spawned tornadoes mostly along the Gulf Coast from Texas to Florida, with isolated tornadoes elsewhere. On April 26, an F3 tornado struck a lumberyard near Baton Rouge, Louisiana, producing extensive damage to the area. An F1 tornado injured six people near Panama City Beach, Florida. A deadly F2 tornado struck the Burbage Crossroads area in North Carolina on April 27, killing one person and injuring another. The entire severe weather event caused one fatality and nine injuries.

April 30–May 1

A localized outbreak sequence—concentrated over Oklahoma, Kansas, Missouri, and Arkansas—occurred on April 30–May 1. An F2 tornado struck the outskirts of White Deer, Texas, tearing roofs from homes and flattening many trailers, with three injuries. A separate F2 tornado damaged several structures, including a café, as it passed over part of the Great Salt Plains Lake and tracked near Medford in Oklahoma, inflicting six injuries. On May 1, a low-end F2 tornado hit Siloam Springs, Arkansas, toppling several structures, including a broiler facility, and causing four injuries in the area. Later that day, the strongest tornado of the outbreak sequence produced F3 damage near Kahoka, Missouri, where it removed most walls from a home, killed two people in mobile homes, and injured 20. The outbreak sequence injured 33 people.

May
250 tornadoes were reported in May in the United States.

May 6–8

An extensive tornado outbreak sequence on May 6–8 produced tornadoes from the High Plains to the Southeast. Later that day, the only F5 tornado of the year in the U.S. touched down near Valley Mills, Texas, leveling a few barns, with only scant debris left on the foundations. There were no casualties, making this the only F5/EF5 tornado in the US to not cause any casualties. The next day, May 7, an F3 tornado affected the vicinity of Poplar Bluff, Missouri, where it tipped over boxcars, flattened a barn, and turned a home that stayed on its foundation. Seven injuries occurred. On May 8, a long-tracked F2 tornado traveled almost  through the Guntersville–Rainsville area in Alabama, damaging or destroying numerous structures, killing two people, and injuring 12. The entire outbreak sequence produced 47 tornadoes, killing two, and injuring 41.

May 9–10

A deadly tornado outbreak affected the state of Ohio on May 10, though tornado activity began as early as May 9 in Minnesota.

May 22–31

A massive outbreak sequence produced 145 tornadoes, including four violent tornadoes. On May 24, a well-documented F4 tornado killed two and injured four in Union City, Oklahoma. On May 26, a tornado was captured on time-lapse as it spun on the southwest edge of the storm west of Wichita, Kansas. It was also a violent F4 tornado. Three people were killed when the tornado picked up a 19-foot boat and threw it back in the water. That same day, another long-tracked F4 tornado in Northeastern Arkansas killed three and injured 289. One more disastrous, long-tracked F4 tornado occurred the next day in Central Alabama north of Birmingham, Alabama, killing seven and injuring 199. In the end, the tornadoes caused 24 fatalities and 820 injuries.

June
224 tornadoes were reported in June in the United States.

July
80 tornadoes were reported in July in the United States.

August
51 tornadoes were reported in August in the United States.

August 28
At approximately 1 p.m. (EDT), an F4 tornado touched down in Canaan, New York and moved in a south-southeast direction across the Massachusetts state line into the town of West Stockbridge, Massachusetts. It caused significant damage to the Berkshire Farm for Boys in Canaan then “obliterated” nearly every house in its path in West Stockbridge. Finally, it leveled the Berkshire Truck Stop on Massachusetts Route 102 near the Massachusetts Turnpike, overturning and throwing trucks and cars and ripping gas pumps out of their stands. When it was over, four people had been killed (including three at the truck stop), 36 were injured, and approximately $25 million ($148 million, 2021 USD) in damage had been done.

September
69 tornadoes were reported in September in the United States.

October
25 tornadoes were reported in October in the United States.

November
81 tornadoes were reported in November in the United States.

December
49 tornadoes were reported in December in the United States.

December 13
An F4 tornado killed two people in Greenwood, South Carolina. Three F3s and two F2s were also associated with the outbreak.

See also

 Tornado
 Tornadoes by year
 Tornado records
 Tornado climatology
 Tornado myths
 Tornado intensity
 Fujita scale
 Enhanced Fujita scale
 List of tornado outbreaks
 List of F5 and EF5 tornadoes
 List of North American tornadoes and tornado outbreaks
 List of 21st-century Canadian tornadoes and tornado outbreaks
 List of European tornadoes and tornado outbreaks
 List of tornadoes and tornado outbreaks in Asia
 List of Southern Hemisphere tornadoes and tornado outbreaks
 List of tornadoes striking downtown areas

Notes

References

External links
 6-Hourly NCEP/NCAR Reanalysis Data Composites

 
1973 meteorology
Tornado-related lists by year
Torn